Gbapleau is a town in western Ivory Coast. It is a sub-prefecture of Duékoué Department in Guémon Region, Montagnes District.

Gbapleu was a commune until March 2012, when it became one of 1126 communes nationwide that were abolished.

In 2021, the population of the sub-prefecture of Gbapleu was 60,833.

Villages
The seven villages of the sub-prefecture of Gbapleu and their population in 2014 are:
 Fouedougou (12 760)
 Gbapleu (22 219)
 Kéïtadougou (2 261)
 Krazandougou (12 817)
 Ouattaradougou (12 880)
 Sioville (1 158)
 Telably (2 454)

Notes

Sub-prefectures of Guémon
Former communes of Ivory Coast